Corydoras haraldschultzi is a tropical freshwater fish belonging to the Corydoradinae sub-family of the family Callichthyidae.  It is found in Brazil and Bolivia.

The fish will grow to 7 centimeters.  It lives in a tropical climate in water with a 6.0 – 8.0 pH, a water hardness of 2 – 25 dGH, and a temperature range of 75 – 83 °F (24 – 28 °C).  It feeds on worms, benthic crustaceans, insects, and plant matter.  It lays eggs in dense vegetation and adults do not guard the eggs.  During each spawning in captivity, eggs are dropped by the female into her ventral fin pouch which are then taken by the female and placed at a previously cleaned site where they adhere to the substrate.  Eggs, 2 mm in diameter, are laid mainly on the underside of fern leaves in close proximity to each other.

Corydoras haraldschultzi is of commercial importance in the aquarium trade industry. It is occasionally confused with Corydoras sterbai: the difference is that Corydoras haraldschultzi has a pattern of black dots on a gold background on the head, whereas C. sterbai has a pattern of gold dots on a black background.

The fish is named in honor of ethnographer and fish collector Harald Schultz (1909-1966), who collected the type specimen.

See also
 List of freshwater aquarium fish species

References

External links
 Photos from Fishbase

Corydoras
Fish of Bolivia
Fish of Brazil
Taxa named by Joachim Knaack
Fish described in 1962